Clavius is one of the largest crater formations on the Moon and the second largest crater on the visible near side (very close in size to Deslandres). It is located in the rugged southern highlands of the Moon, to the south of the prominent ray crater Tycho. It is named for the Jesuit priest Christopher Clavius.

Description 
Clavius' location toward the southern limb of the Moon causes it to appear oblong due to foreshortening. Its great size makes it visible to the unaided eye as a prominent notch in the terminator about one to two days after the Moon reaches first quarter. 

Clavius is one of the older formations on the lunar surface and was likely formed during the Nectarian period about four billion years ago. Despite its age the crater is relatively well-preserved. 

It has a low outer wall in comparison to its size and is heavily worn and pock-marked by craterlets. The rim does not significantly overlook the surrounding terrain making it a "walled depression". The inner surface of the rim is hilly, notched and varies in width with the steepest portion to the south. The rim has been observed to have a somewhat polygonal outline overall.

Crater floor 
The floor of Clavius forms a convex plain that is marked by some interesting crater impacts. The most notable of these is a curving chain of craters that begins with Rutherfurd in the south then arcs across the floor in a counterclockwise direction forming a sequence of ever diminishing diameters. From largest to smallest, these craters are designated Clavius D, C, N, J, and JA. This sequence of diminishing craters has proved a useful tool for amateur astronomers who want to test the resolution of their small telescopes.

The crater floor retains a remnant of a central massif, which lies between Clavius C and N. The relative smoothness of the floor and the low size of the central peaks may indicate that the crater surface was formed some time after the original impact.

Presence of water 
In October 2020, NASA confirmed the existence of molecular water near Clavius, at concentrations of up to 412 parts per million.  The water could be trapped into tiny beadlike structures in the soil that form out of the high heat created by micrometeorite impacts. The water might also be sheltered between lunar soil grains. Another possibility is from very small asteroid strikes, such as a rubble pile from a much more massive "parent" asteroid collision. Pulled apart in its descent to the lunar surface similar to Comet Shoemaker–Levy 9, and hitting the surface in a modest dispersal area with a small mass at low, oblique impact angle and bouncing could allow some water to remain in the lithic matrix. The carbonaceous chondrite class is often water-rich, and the CI sub group are as much as 22% water.

Nearby craters 
Notable nearby craters include Scheiner to the west; Blancanus to the southwest; Maginus in the northeast, and Longomontanus to the northwest. The crater Rutherfurd lies entirely within the southeastern rim, while Porter overlays the northeast wall. The smaller crater Clavius L lies across the western rim while Clavius K breaks through the west-southwest rim.

Satellite craters
By convention these features are identified on lunar maps by placing the letter on the side of the crater midpoint that is closest to Clavius.

In popular culture
 Clavius Base, the site of a lunar administrative facility in the movie 2001: A Space Odyssey
 Time-travel facility located under Clavius in the 2015 Madeira Desouza novel entitled Baja Clavius: Moon Men Deep Inside
 The location of the fictional Tranquility Base Hotel & Casino in the Arctic Monkeys song "Four Out of Five"

References

External links

 Video by Seán Doran of sunset on Clavius, based on LRO data (see album for more)

Impact craters on the Moon
Nectarian